Thomas P. Cullinan (November 4, 1919 – June 11, 1995) was an American novelist and playwright, as well as a writer for television. He is perhaps best known for his 1966 novel The Beguiled, which was made into two films of the same name, in 1971 and again in 2017.

Early life
Cullinan was born and raised in Cleveland, Ohio, in an Irish Catholic family. He graduated from Cathedral Latin High School in 1938, and later attended Case Western Reserve University.

Career
In addition to The Beguiled (1966), Cullinan's novel about a Union soldier recuperating at a girls' school in Confederate Mississippi during the Civil War, he wrote three novels—The Besieged (1970), The Eighth Sacrament (1977), and The Bedeviled (1978)—as well as several plays, which are still produced. He received a Ford Foundation grant to represent the United States at a literary colloquium in Berlin in 1964, and he wrote a weekly television program in his hometown of Cleveland, Ohio, both for WKYC, a local television affiliate, and for Case Western Reserve University. The Beguiled was twice made into a film: in 1971, directed by Don Siegel and starring Clint Eastwood and Geraldine Page; and in 2017, directed by Sofia Coppola and starring Nicole Kidman and Colin Farrell.

Death
Cullinan died of a heart attack on June 11, 1995 at a local theater in Cleveland Heights where he was judging a high school playwrighting festival. Cullinan's papers are kept at the Kent State University archive, which include an unpublished play based on the Marilyn Sheppard murder case.

Awards 
Cleveland Arts Prize (1971)
Ford Fondation grants (1964 and 1966)

Notable works 
Books
 1966: The Beguiled
 1970: The Besieged 
 1974: The Roots of Social Injustice
 1975: If the Eye Be Sound
 1975: Paths Are Made by Those Who Walk on Them
 1977: The Eighth Sacrament
 1978: The Bedeviled 
 1988: Inherited Illusions: Integrating the Sacred & the Secular

Produced Plays
 1969: Mrs. Lincoln
 1970: The Attic
 1996: The Rose of Tralee
 2000: The Wayward Angel

References 

1919 births
1995 deaths
American male novelists
American people of Irish descent
American dramatists and playwrights
Case Western Reserve University alumni
Writers from Cleveland
Novelists from Ohio
20th-century American male writers